Grant is an unincorporated community in Choctaw County, Oklahoma, United States. It is located along U.S. Route 271, south of Hugo. As of the 2010 census it had a population of 289.

History 
The community was founded as a station stop on the St. Louis and San Francisco Railroad, which opened through the Indian Territory in June 1887.  A post office opened at Grant, Indian Territory on January 31, 1889.  It was named for President Ulysses S. Grant.

At the time of its founding, Grant was located in Kiamitia County, a part of the Apukshunnubbee District of the Choctaw Nation.

Demographics

As of the 2010 Census, there were 289 people, 120 households, and 82 families residing in the community. The racial composition of the city was 55.0% White, 23.9% African American, 9.3% Native American, 2.4% from other races, and 9.3% from two or more races. Hispanic or Latino of any race were 3.8% of the population.

Of the 120 households, 30.8% had children under the age of 18 living with them, 45.0% were married couples living together, 18.3% had a female householder with no husband present, and 31.7% were non-families. 29.2% of all households were made up of individuals, and 13.4% had someone living alone who was 65 years of age or older. The average household size was 2.41 and the average family size was 2.85.

In the city the population was spread out, with 21.8% under the age of 18, 10.0% from 18 to 24, 20.8% from 25 to 44, 29.4% from 45 to 64, and 18.0% who were 65 years of age or older. The median age was 42.8 years. For every 100 females, there were 88.9 males. For every 100 females age 18 and over, there were 85.2 males.

According to the 2013 American Community Survey, the median income for a household in the city was $33,750 and the median income for a family was $43,942. The per capita income for the city was $18,293. About 6.9% of the population and 3.5% of families were below the poverty line, including 5.6% of those under age 18 and 25.0% of those age 65 or over.

Notable people
 Alan B. Banister, U.S. Navy Rear Admiral and double Navy Cross recipient 
 Mark Dinning, pop music singer

References

Further reading
Shirk, George H. Oklahoma Place Names. Norman: University of Oklahoma Press, 1987.  .

External links
 Encyclopedia of Oklahoma History and Culture - Grant

Census-designated places in Choctaw County, Oklahoma
Census-designated places in Oklahoma